Sergelen Orgoi FACS is a Mongolian surgeon best known for developing low cost liver transplantation and laparoscopic surgery in Mongolia. She is an Honorary Fellow of the American College of Surgeons (ACS). She is a Professor of Surgery and the Head of Surgery Department at the Mongolian National University of Medical Sciences, and Vice President of the Mongolian Surgical Association.

Education 
Sergelen earned a Bachelor of Medicine (BM) in 1982, a Master of Clinical Medicine (MM) in 1983, a Doctor of Medicine (MD) in 1997, and a Doctor of Philosophy (PhD) in 2002 from the Mongolian National University of Medical Sciences (MNUMS). She completed medical fellowships in developed countries such as South Korea, Switzerland, USA, and Finland.

Career
Sergelen taught surgery at the Mongolian National University of Medical Sciences from 1982 to 2002. In 2002, she became the Head of the Surgery Department there, and she holds this position to present date.

Developing low-cost liver transplantation in Mongolia 
In 2011, Sergelen and her team of surgeons did the first successful liver transplantation in Mongolia at the First Central Hospital of Mongolia. Her team had done test surgeries on 26 pigs for three years. Since then, her team has done 47 liver transplantations in Mongolia. Recognizing that liver cancer is the most prevalent and economically disastrous cancer in Mongolia, Sergelen led the development of low-cost liver transplants in Mongolia. Now liver transplants cost MNT 10-15 million (around US$3–5 thousand). She proposed that Mongolian state health budget cover all liver transplantations. Now the state budget covers 75 percent of all liver transplantations in Mongolia.

Awards 
In 2017, Sergelen was honored by the American College of Surgeons with the Honorary Fellowship award for her commitment to treating the people of her country Mongolia. The American College of Surgeons praised that

“Professor Sergelen has been a true pioneer in modern surgical care. She challenged the popular dogma that surgery was too expensive and instead showed to the world that surgery can reach all communities. Problems of a rugged geography, serious political and financial constraints, and the large nomadic setting have never prevented her from improving health care in Mongolia. Despite her naysayers, she led projects that are presenting impressive examples of possibilities for other low and middle income countries. Professor Sergelen is one of modern surgery’s most impactful leaders for low and middle income countries.”

References

Living people
Mongolian surgeons
1958 births